Marcel Aregger (born 26 August 1990) is a Swiss former professional racing cyclist. He rode in the Vuelta a España in 2014, and 2015, finishing 117th and 106th respectively.

Major results

2010
 7th Eschborn–Frankfurt Under–23
2011
 1st  Road race, National Under-23 Road Championships
 8th Sparkassen Giro Bochum
2012
 9th Paris–Troyes

References

External links

1990 births
Living people
Swiss male cyclists
Sportspeople from the canton of Zug
21st-century Swiss people